Luigi Antognini (8 September 1886 – 21 July 1966) was a Swiss athlete. He competed in the men's shot put at the 1920 Summer Olympics.

References

External links
 

1886 births
1966 deaths
Athletes (track and field) at the 1920 Summer Olympics
Swiss male shot putters
Olympic athletes of Switzerland
Place of birth missing